AllSides is an American company that attempts to assess the political bias of prominent media outlets, and presents different versions of similar news stories from sources of the political right, left, and center, in a mission to show readers news outside their filter bubble. Focusing on online publications, it has rated over 800 sources on a five-point scale: Left, Leans left, Center, Leans right, and Right. Each source is ranked by unpaid volunteer editors, overseen by two staff members holding political biases different from each other. These crowd-sourced reviews are augmented by editorial reviews performed by staff members. Reassessments may be made based on like button results from community feedback. AllSides uses these rankings to produce media bias charts listing popular sources.

AllSides was founded in 2012 by John Gable, a former Republican political aide turned Silicon Valley manager working at Netscape, and Scott McDonald, a software developer. AllSides uses a "multi-partisan" methodology first developed by conservative professor Timothy Groseclose and his collaborator Jeffrey Milyo. AllSides partnered with activist Joan Blades to launch a classroom program, AllSides for Schools, and has partnered with other organizations to provide programs such as Mismatch, a platform to connect users who differ politically and geographically.

See also 

 Ad Fontes Media
 Media Bias/Fact Check
 NewsGuard
 Our.News

References

External links
 

Internet properties established in 2012
Media bias